American Ninja Warrior: USA vs. The World is a television special aired approximately once a year on NBC. It features an American Ninja Warrior team from the United States competing against teams from other countries around the world, including Japan, Europe, Latin America, Asia, and Australia, for bragging rights and the American Ninja Warrior: USA vs. The World trophy. The competitors race on the same Mount Midoriyama course used in the National Finals on the Las Vegas Strip.

Series overview

Specials

USA vs. Japan (January 2014)

During the Season 5 finale of American Ninja Warrior, NBC announced that a special "USA vs. Japan" matchup would take place, the first-ever international competition in American Ninja Warrior's history. The two-hour special premiered on January 13, 2014, at 8 pm EST on NBC and matched five Japanese Sasuke All-Stars and New Stars - heroes of the original Ninja Warrior - against five American stars representing American Ninja Warrior at the American reconstruction of the Mount Midoriyama course in Las Vegas. At stake was the United States vs. Japan championship; also branded as the first world championship for Sasuke/American Ninja Warrior, and a trophy to match. The special featured American Ninja Warrior's regular broadcasting crew: analysts Matt Iseman and Akbar Gbaja-Biamila, along with sideline reporter Jenn Brown.

Rosters

Overview

 There are up to 5 matches on each stage: 1, 2, and 3.
 In each match, one athlete from the USA and Japan will run.
 The first team to win 3 matches wins the stage, and as the difficulty for each stage increases, so too will the points awarded.
 Stage 1 = 1 point
 Stage 2 = 2 points
 Stage 3 = 3 points
 Stage 4 = Tiebreaker
 Each team will choose one member to climb to the top of the 100-foot tower.
 Whichever athlete does it fastest, their country will take home the inaugural world championship trophy.

Results

Stage 1

All three Americans: James McGrath, Paul Kasemir, and Brent Steffensen completed Stage 1, with Hitoshi Kanno also completing it for Team Japan. McGrath finished in 1:16.67. Kanno finished in 1:25.43. Kasemir finished in 1:24.80. Steffensen finished in a record-breaking 1:14.53, the fastest time for an American on Stage 1 until Joe Moravsky beat it with a time of 1:12.72 the next year.

Leaderboard

Stage 2

Brian Arnold and James McGrath both completed Stage 2 for Team USA. Arnold finished with a time of 1:14.63, and McGrath finished with a time of 1:15.00.

Leaderboard

Stage 3

Paul Kasemir became the MVP of Team USA by making it all the way to the last obstacle of Stage 3, the Flying Bar, winning the competition for the Americans.

Final Score: Team USA: 6, Team Japan: 0

Champions: Team USA

USA vs. The World (September 2014)

During the Season 6 finale, NBC announced that another special entitled "USA vs. The World" matchup would take place in Las Vegas under a new format. On September 15, Team USA competed against a returning Team Japan, and a new team, Team Europe. This was the second international competition that pitted top competitors from the United States American Ninja Warrior, Japan Ninja Warrior (Sasuke), and also European All Stars. The three-hour special aired on September 15, 2014, on NBC with an encore airing September 16, 2014, on Esquire. The special once again was hosted by hosts Matt Iseman and Akbar Gbaja-Biamila, as well as sideline reporter Jenn Brown.

Rosters

Overview

 There are 3 heats on each stage: 1, 2, and 3.
 In each heat, one athlete from the USA, Europe, and Japan will run.
 Stage 1 = 1 point
 Stage 2 = 2 points
 Stage 3 = 3 points
 Stage 4 = Tiebreaker
 It will come down to a 7-story rope climb to determine the winner.

Results

Stage 1
Joe Moravsky beat Brent Steffensen's record of 1:14.53 from last year’s USA vs. Japan special in 1:12.72, the fastest time for an American on Stage 1. However, Tim Shieff beat Moravsky's time in a subsequent heat by finishing in 1:02.70 - the fastest time ever on Stage 1 in ANW history. Paul Kasemir also completed Stage 1 with a time of 1:17.21.

Leaderboard

Stage 2

All three Americans: Travis Rosen, Elet Hall, and Brian Arnold completed Stage 2, with Sean McColl also completing it for Team Europe. Rosen achieved the fastest time by an American on Stage 2 with 1:48.00, but McColl finished with a time of 1:46.51, the fastest of the season. Arnold finished with a time of 2:55.57, and Hall finished with a time of 2:06.32.

Leaderboard

Stage 3

Yusuke Morimoto made ANW history by becoming the first athlete to ever finish Stage 3 with a time of 5:38.91. Stefano Ghisolfi became the second athlete and first European to finish Stage 3 with a time of 4:46.89. Ryo Matachi followed by becoming the third athlete to complete Stage 3 with a time of 5:04.67. Brian Arnold became the fourth athlete and first American to complete Stage 3 with a time of 4:39.90, the fastest of the four finishers. Arnold's finish moved Team USA into a tie with Team Europe, forcing a climb-off on Stage 4.

Leaderboard

Stage 4

For the first time in ANW history, the athletes competed on Stage 4. Travis Rosen was selected as the first competitor on ANW to attempt the final stage and he made it all the way up Midoriyama's 90-foot tower with a 77-foot rope with a time of 0:35.77. However, Sean McColl beat Rosen's time by 3/10th of a second (0:00.31), winning the competition for Team Europe as they became the World Champions of ANW. Rosen missed on his first attempt at hitting the buzzer at the end of the rope climb.

Leaderboard

Final Score: Team Europe: 10, Team USA: 9, Team Japan: 0

Champions: Team Europe

USA vs. The World (January 2016)

NBC announced that another USA vs. The World matchup would again take place in Las Vegas. It was the third international competition to unite ANW alumni, Sasuke all-stars, and European competitors for the Season 7 finale. The 3-hour special aired on January 31, 2016, on NBC. It was hosted by the current American Ninja Warrior hosts, Matt Iseman, Akbar Gbaja-Biamila, and co-host Kristine Leahy.

Rosters

Overview

 There are 3 heats on each stage: 1, 2, and 3.
 In each heat, one athlete from the USA, Europe, and Japan will run.
 Stage 1 = 1 point
 Stage 2 = 2 points
 Stage 3 = 3 points
 Stage 4 = Tiebreaker
 A competitor from each team will race side-by-side up the 7-story rope climb of Stage 4 to determine who becomes the world champion.

Results

Stage 1

Drew Drechsel gets the fastest time of the season with a time of 1:18.61, beating Tim Shieff's time of 1:25.33.

Leaderboard

Stage 2

Sean McColl edged out both Drew Drechsel's time of 1:34.46, and Joe Moravsky's time of 1:23.69, beating them with a speedy time of 1:19.86, the fastest of the ANW season.

Leaderboard

Stage 3

Yusuke Morimoto was the only member of Team Japan to finish this stage with a time of 6:29.38. Sean McColl finished with a faster time of 5:42.25, putting Team Europe in the lead. Isaac Caldiero was the last to compete and needed a 3-point win in order to put Team USA on top. Caldiero brought his team to victory with an impressive time of 4:28.84, the fastest of the season, making this the POM Wonderful "Run of the Night".

Leaderboard

Final Score: Team USA: 10, Team Europe: 8, Team Japan: 0

Champions: Team USA

USA vs. The World (June 2017)

The fourth international competition aired on June 4, 2017. Once again, it was hosted by the current American Ninja Warrior hosts, Matt Iseman, Akbar Gbaja-Biamila, and co-host Kristine Leahy. This year, Team USA and Team Europe faced a new challenger; Team Latin America.

Rosters

Overview

 There are 3 heats on each stage: 1, 2, and 3.
 In each heat, one athlete from the USA, Europe, and Latin America will run.
 Stage 1 = 1 point
 Stage 2 = 2 points
 Stage 3 = 3 points
 Stage 4 = Tiebreaker
 A competitor from each team will race side-by-side up the 7-story rope climb of Stage 4 to determine who becomes the world champion.

Results

Stage 1
Daniel Gil and Jake Murray both completed Stage 1 for Team USA, with Owen McKenzie also completing it for Team Europe. Gil finished with a time of 1:47.58. McKenzie finished with a time of 2:38.66. Murray finished with a time of 1:28.43, the fastest of the season.

Leaderboard

Stage 2
Both Europeans Sean McColl and Stefano Ghisolfi completed Stage 2. Drew Drechsel was supposed to run the last heat, but he decided not to run, to stay fresh for Stage 3. Jessie Graff took his spot, and after a previous disappointing run on Stage 1, she redeemed herself by becoming the first woman to complete Stage 2, winning the heat for Team USA, and making this the POM Wonderful "Run of the Night".

Leaderboard

Stage 3
Josh Levin and Drew Drechsel both completed Stage 3 for Team USA, putting them on a list of only a handful of athletes to do so. Levin finished with a time of 6:41.09. Drechsel was listening to “I’ll Make a Man Out of You” from Disney’s Mulan during his run and ultimately won the competition for the Americans.

Leaderboard

Final Score: Team USA: 10, Team Europe: 7, Team Latin America: 1

Champions: Team USA

USA vs. The World (March 2018)

The fifth international competition aired for 3 hours on March 11, 2018. Returning are the current American Ninja Warrior hosts, Matt Iseman, Akbar Gbaja-Biamila, and sideline reporter Kristine Leahy. This year, Team USA (blue), Team Europe (green) and Team Latin America (yellow) faced a new challenger; Team Asia (red).

Rosters

Overview

 There are 2 heats on each stage: 1, 2, and 3.
 In each heat on Stages 1 and 2, one athlete from the USA, Europe, Latin America, and Asia will run.
 1st place = 3 points
 2nd place = 2 points
 3rd place = 1 point
 4th place = 0 points
 The three highest scoring teams will move on to Stage 3.
 1st place = 2 points
 2nd place = 1 point
 3rd place = 0 points
 The two highest scoring teams will move on to Stage 4 for a side-by-side climb-off.
 Whoever gets to the top first takes home the title.

Results

Stage 1
During Heat 1 of Stage 1, Team USA was represented by Joe Moravsky, Team Europe by Øssur Eiriksfoss, Team Latin America by Karl Fow, and Team Asia by Thuc Le. Moravsky fell on the Domino Pipes, while Eiriksfoss fell on the Jumping Spider, and Le fell on the Double Dipper. Fow was the only one to complete the course. Team Latin America won the heat.

During Heat 2 of Stage 1, Team USA was represented by Drew Drechsel, Team Europe by Sergio Verdasco, Team Latin America by Danee Marmolejo, and Team Asia by Tomohiro Kawaguchi. Drechsel, Verdasco, and Marmolejo all finished the course while Kawaguchi fell on the Domino Pipes. Team USA won the heat. At the end of both heats, the points totals were added.

Leaderboard

Stage 2
During Heat 1 of Stage 2, Team USA was represented by Sean Bryan, Team Europe by Alexander Mars, Team Latin America by Marco Jubes, and Team Asia by Yusuke Morimoto. Bryan fell at Wingnut Alley, while Mars fell at the Wave Runner. Jubes and Morimoto both fell at the Swing Surfer. Team USA won the heat.

During Heat 2 of Stage 2, Team USA was represented by Najee Richardson, Team Europe by Sean McColl, Team Latin America by Sebastian Prieto, and Team Asia by Yosua Zalukhu. Richardson and McColl both completed the course, while Prieto fell on the Criss Cross Salmon Ladder, and Zalukhu fell on the Wave Runner. As McColl finished fastest, Team Europe won the heat. At the end of both heats, points totals from Stage One and Two were combined, with Team USA leading with 10 points, Team Europe with 6 points, and Team Latin America with 5 points. Team Asia had the fewest points and was eliminated.

Leaderboard

Stage 3
During Heat 1 of Stage 3, Team USA was represented by Drew Drechsel, Team Europe by Sergio Verdasco, and Team Latin America by Marco Jubes. Drechsel and Verdasco both fell on the Ultimate Cliffhanger, while Jubes fell on the first obstacle, the Floating Boards. Team Europe won the heat, as Verdasco made it to the Ultimate Cliffhanger faster than Team USA's Drechsel.

During Heat 2 of Stage 3, Team USA was represented by Joe Moravsky, Team Europe by Alexander Mars, and Team Latin America by Sebastian Prieto. All 3 fell on the Ultimate Cliffhanger. However, Team USA won the heat as Moravsky made it to the obstacle faster than Team Europe's Mars. At the end of both heats, the points totals were combined, with Team USA and Team Europe tied with 3 points. Team Latin America had 0 points and was eliminated.

Stage 4
During Stage 4, Team USA was represented by Sean Bryan, while Team Europe was represented by Sean McColl. In an 80-foot rope climb race to the top of Mount Midoriyama, McColl edged out Bryan with a time of 0:25:93, just faster than Bryan's 0:26:79. Team Europe was then declared champions, earning their second USA vs. The World trophy. That final climb-off was also named the POM Wonderful "Run of the Night".

Leaderboard

Final Score: Team Europe: 4, Team USA: 3, Team Latin America: 0

Champions: Team Europe

USA vs. The World (January 2019)

The sixth international competition aired on January 27, 2019. It featured competitors from the United States, Europe, and for the first time, Australia. Every team had at least one female competitor.

Rosters

Overview

 There are 2 heats on each stage: 1, 2, and 3.
 In each heat, one athlete from the USA, Europe, and Australia will run.
 1st place = 2 points
 2nd place = 1 point
 3rd place = 0 points
 The two highest scoring teams will move on to Stage 4 for a side-by-side climb-off.
 Whoever gets to the top first takes home the title.

Results

Stage 1
During Stage 1, Heat 1, Team USA's Barclay Stockett set her own record when she completed the course, hitting the buzzer for the very first time. She made ANW history by becoming only the third woman to finish Stage 1 with a time of 3:02.57, earning one point for Team USA. Jack Wilson also completed the course with a time of 2:30.61, earning two points for Team Australia.

During Stage 1, Heat 2, Mathis "Kid" Owhadi, the youngest competitor to ever join Team USA, completed the stage with a blazing time of 1:27.18, earning two points for the Americans. This made it the fastest of the season. Oliver Edelmann and Ashlin Herbert also completed the stage. Edelmann finished with a time of 2:49.36 for Team Europe, and Herbert finished with a time of 2:09.80, earning one point for Team Australia.

Leaderboard

Stage 2
During Stage 2, Heat 1, Najee Richardson completed the course with a time of 3:50.86, earning one point for Team USA. Bryson Klein also completed the course with a time of 3:42.83, earning two points for Team Australia.

During Stage 2, Heat 2, Jesse "Flex" Labreck made ANW history when she not only completed the stage, but finished it in the fastest time than the other ninjas in her heat, earning two points for Team USA. Labreck is only the second woman to achieve this feat, following in the footsteps of stuntwoman Jessie Graff from two years ago.

Leaderboard

Stage 3
During Stage 3, Drew Drechsel made it the furthest out of all the other Ninjas in his heat by making it all the way to the second to last obstacle, Cane Lane, earning two points for Team USA and eliminating Team Europe.

Final Score: Team USA: 8, Team Australia: 6, Team Europe: 1

Stage 4
During Stage 4, it was Drew Drechsel of Team USA vs. Ashlin Herbert of Team Australia to rope climb the 80-foot tower of Mt. Midoriyama. Despite Herbert's team putting a bucket of beer at the top for extra motivation, it was Drechsel who completed the climb in a time of 0:33.43 seconds, winning it for Team USA.

Leaderboard

Champions: Team USA

USA vs. The World (January 2020)

The seventh international competition aired on January 26, 2020. It featured competitors from the United States, Europe, and Australia. Every team had one female competitor.

The Australian premiere broadcast was heavily edited to remove most of the footage of Drew Drechsel; due to current US legal proceedings.

Rosters

Overview

 There are 3 heats on Stage 1, 2 heats on Stage 2, and 1 heat on Stage 3.
 In each heat, one athlete from the USA, Europe, and Australia will run.
 1st place = 2 points on Stage 1, 3 points on Stage 2, and 5 points on Stage 3.
 2nd place = 1 point on Stage 1, 2 points on Stage 2, and 3 points on Stage 3.
 3rd place = 0 points on Stage 1, 1 point on Stage 2, and 1 point on Stage 3.
 The two highest scoring teams will move on to Stage 4 for a side-by-side climb-off.
 Whoever gets to the top first takes home the title.

Results

Stage 1
During Stage 1, Heat 1, Olivia Vivian made ANW history when she became the first female international competitor to hit the buzzer. This made her only the fourth woman overall to finish Stage 1. Her time was 2.56.26, earning one point for Team Australia. Michael Torres also finished Stage 1 with a time of 1:42.36, earning two points for Team USA.

During Stage 1, Heat 2, Adam Rayl finished Stage 1 with a time of 1:52.50, earning two points for Team USA.

During Stage 1, Heat 3, Jesse “Flex” Labreck became the fifth woman to finish Stage 1, earning two points for Team USA.

Leaderboard

Stage 2
During Stage 2, Heat 1, Daniel Gil finished Stage 2 with a time of 2:24.47, earning three points for Team USA.

During Stage 2, Heat 2, Bryson Klein finished Stage 2 with a time of 2:02.39, earning three points for Team Australia.

Leaderboard

Stage 3
During Stage 3, despite Drew Drechsel injuring his left hand and wrist, he muscled through and completed the course, earning five points for Team USA and eliminating Team Europe.

Leaderboard

Final Score: Team USA: 16, Team Australia: 8, Team Europe: 6

Stage 4
During Stage 4, Adam Rayl of Team USA climbed against Bryson Klein of Team Australia. Klein made it up the rope faster and won it for Team Australia, their first championship in only two appearances.

Leaderboard

Champions: Team Australia

Ratings

References

External links

USA vs. The World
NBC television specials